Group B of the 2021 FIFA Arab Cup took place from 30 November 2021 to 6 December 2021. The group consisted of Tunisia, the United Arab Emirates, Syria and Mauritania.

The top two teams, Tunisia and the United Arab Emirates, advanced to the quarter-finals.

Teams

Standings 

In the quarter-finals:
Tunisia advanced to play against Oman (runners-up of Group A).
United Arab Emirates advanced to play against Qatar (winners of Group A).

Matches

Tunisia vs Mauritania 

Assistant referees:
Mohammadreza Mansouri (Iran)
Mohammadreza Abolfazli (Iran)
Fourth official:
Fernando Hernández Gómez (Mexico)
Video assistant referee:
Khamis Al-Marri (Qatar)
Assistant video assistant referees:
Hiroyuki Kimura (Japan)

United Arab Emirates vs Syria

Assistant referees:
Zakhele Siwela (South Africa)
Jerson dos Santos (Angola)
Fourth official:
Facundo Tello (Argentina)
Video assistant referee:
Shaun Evans (Australia)
Assistant video assistant referees:
Rédouane Jiyed (Morocco)
Danilo Manis (Brazil)
Eber Aquino (Paraguay)

Mauritania vs United Arab Emirates

Assistant referees:
Martin Soppi (Uruguay)
Carlos Barreiro (Uruguay)
Fourth official:
Alireza Faghani (Iran)
Video assistant referee:
Juan Soto (Venezuela)
Assistant video assistant referees:
Leodán González (Uruguay)
Christian Gittelmann (Germany)
Jair Marrufo (United States)

Syria vs Tunisia

Assistant referees:
Micheal Barwegen (Canada)
Karen Diaz Medina (Mexico)
Fourth official:
Ryuji Sato (Japan)
Video assistant referee:
Adonai Escobedo (Mexico)
Assistant video assistant referees:
Eber Aquino (Paraguay)
Osamu Nomura (Japan)
Kevin Blom (Netherlands)

Syria vs Mauritania

Assistant referees:
Danilo Simon (Brazil)
Bruno Pires (Brazil)
Fourth official:
Janny Sikazwe (Zambia)
Video assistant referee:
Rafael Traci (Brazil)
Assistant video assistant referees:
Leodán González (Uruguay)
Zakhele Siwela (South Africa)
Guillermo Cuadra (Spain)

Tunisia vs United Arab Emirates

Assistant referees:
Rafael Foltyn (Germany)
Christian Gittelmann (Germany)
Fourth official:
Matthew Conger (New Zealand)
Video assistant referee:
Christian Dingert (Germany)
Assistant video assistant referees:
Tomasz Kwiatkowski (Poland)
Jerson Dos Santos (Angola)
Eber Aquino (Paraguay)

Notes

References

External links
 

2021 FIFA Arab Cup
2021–22 in Tunisian football
2021–22 in Emirati football
2021–22 in Syrian football
2021 in Mauritian football